Tadian, officially the Municipality of Tadian  is a 4th class municipality in the province of Mountain Province, Philippines. According to the 2020 census, it has a population of 19,341 people.

Tadian was formerly known as Kayan. In 1957, the seat of government was transferred to the barrio of Tadian. Two years later the town was renamed to Tadian.

Geography

Barangays
Tadian is politically subdivided into 19 barangays. These barangays are headed by elected officials: Barangay Captain, Barangay Council, whose members are called Barangay Councilors. All are elected every three years.

Climate

Demographics

Economy

Government
Tadian, belonging to the lone congressional district of the province of Mountain Province, is governed by a mayor designated as its local chief executive and by a municipal council as its legislative body in accordance with the Local Government Code. The mayor, vice mayor, and the councilors are elected directly by the people through an election which is being held every three years.

Elected officials

Members of the Municipal Council (2019–2022):
 Congressman: Maximo Y. Dalog Jr.
 Mayor: Constito S. Masweng
 Vice-Mayor: Alfonso D. Polan
 Councilors:
 William S. Ladiong
 John P. Malamnao Jr.
 Jayne D. Saong
 George C. Bisen Jr.
 Texter Jack L. Taclobao
 Johnson W. Balaoas
 Louie S. Buned
 Junifer K. Kidit Sr.

See also
List of renamed cities and municipalities in the Philippines

References

External links

 [ Philippine Standard Geographic Code]
Philippine Census Information

Municipalities of Mountain Province